Ian Harold Woosnam  (born 2 March 1958) is a Welsh professional golfer.

Nicknamed 'Woosie', Woosnam was one of the "Big Five" generation of European golfers, all born within 12 months of one another, all of whom have won majors, and made Europe competitive in the Ryder Cup. His peers in this group were Seve Ballesteros, Nick Faldo, Bernhard Langer, and Sandy Lyle. Woosnam's major championship win was at the 1991 Masters Tournament. He was inducted into the World Golf Hall of Fame in 2017.

Early life
Woosnam was born in the town of Oswestry, Shropshire in England, and his family lived in the nearby village of St Martin's in Shropshire.

Career outline
Woosnam started playing at the unique Llanymynech Golf Club, which straddles the Wales-England border. He played as an amateur in regional competitions in the English county of Shropshire alongside Sandy Lyle.

Woosnam turned professional in 1976 and first played the European Tour in 1979. Woosnam spent his early years on Tour driving around the continent in a camper van, living on a diet of baked beans to save money. After three modest seasons, his career took off in 1982 when he won the Swiss Open and came eighth on the Order of Merit (prize money list). He also finished in the top ten on the Order of Merit every year from 1983 to 1991 and again in 1993, 1996, and 1997, making thirteen times in all. In 1987 and 1990 he was first, and in the former year he set a world record for global tournament earnings of £1,062,662. He has won 28 official money events on the European Tour and many other events around the world.

Woosnam placed third in the 1986 Open Championship. In 1987, Woosnam was criticised by antiapartheid campaigners for playing a tournament in Sun City in apartheid South Africa, in contravention of the United Nations cultural moratorium.

In 1991, he reached the top of the Official World Golf Ranking, eventually spending a total of 50 weeks as World Number 1 (7 April 1991 – 21 March 1992). In the same year, he emulated his British rivals, Sandy Lyle and Nick Faldo, by winning the Masters Tournament; the first person representing Wales to ever win a major championship.

After winning the Torras Monte Carlo Golf Open in 1991, Woosnam had a decline in form in the second half of the year and said that he was suffering from exhaustion after playing in too many tournaments across the world. In December 1991, his sterling silver Masters trophy, a $9,000 copy of the original, was stolen from a British train.

Woosnam's last official European Tour victory was in the 1997 Volvo PGA Championship. In the late 1990s, his form began to fade, but he nearly made a spectacular comeback at The Open Championship in 2001, when he finished third despite suffering a two-stroke penalty for starting the final round with 15 clubs in his bag instead of the allowable maximum of 14. While his caddie, Miles Byrne, was responsible for this error, Woosnam decided at the time not to dismiss him stating: "It is the biggest mistake he will make in his life. He won't do it again. He's a good caddie. I am not going to sack him. He's a good lad." Woosnam did dismiss his caddie two weeks later when, after a night drinking on the town, Byrne failed to turn up to tee-time.

Later in 2001, at the age of 43, Woosnam became the oldest player to win the World Match Play Championship (not an official European Tour event at the time) when he beat Pádraig Harrington 2 & 1 in the final. Woosnam also became the first player to capture the trophy in three different decades, having previously won the World Match Play Championship in 1987 and 1990. Woosnam had a record outward nine holes of 28 (-7) in the 2001 final against Harrington, which tied the tournament record of seven successive birdies in a match.

Woosnam was a member of eight consecutive European Ryder Cup teams from 1983 to 1997. Despite not winning a singles match he accumulated an overall record of 14 wins, 12 losses and 5 halves in 31 matches. He was a vice captain for the 2002 European team and was elected as captain for the 2006 Ryder Cup, leading Europe to victory over the U.S. 18½–9½ at the K Club, County Kildare, Ireland.

On 1 June 2008, Woosnam won his first stroke play title in 11 years at the Parkridge Polish Seniors Championship at Kraków Valley Golf and Country Club, finishing with a course record 63. The tournament was his third appearance on European Seniors Tour, which he joined after turning 50 years old in March 2008. Woosnam went on to win the European Seniors Tour Order of Merit that year becoming the only person to have won the Order of Merit on both the European Seniors Tour and the regular European Tour.

Honours
In December 1987, Woosnam won the first of his three BBC Wales Sports Personality of the Year awards, which he went on to win in 1990 and 1991.

He was the subject of This Is Your Life in 2002 when he was surprised by Michael Aspel at a central London hotel.

Woosnam was awarded an OBE in the 2007 New Years Honours List.

In September 2010, he was inducted to the Welsh Sports Hall of Fame.

Personal life
Woosnam was diagnosed with ankylosing spondylitis (AS) in early 1987, which affects approximately 1 in 200 men and 1 in 500 women in Britain.

In 2008 his son Daniel was given a two-year jail sentence for assault.

Professional wins (52)

PGA Tour wins (2)

PGA Tour playoff record (1–0)

European Tour wins (29)

*Note: Tournament shortened to 54 holes due to rain.
1Co-sanctioned by the PGA Tour of Australasia

European Tour playoff record (3–5)

Asia Golf Circuit wins (2)

Safari Circuit wins (2)

Other wins (11)

Other playoff record (1–2)

Champions Tour wins (1)

Champions Tour playoff record (1–0)

European Senior Tour wins (5)

European Senior Tour playoff record (1–1)

Japan PGA Senior Tour wins (1)

Major championships

Wins (1)

Results timeline
Results not in chronological order in 2020.

CUT = missed the half way cut (3rd round cut in 1982 and 1984 Open Championships)
WD = withdrew
"T" indicates a tie for a place
NT = No tournament due to COVID-19 pandemic

Summary

Most consecutive cuts made – 15 (1989 Masters – 1992 Open Championship)
Longest streak of top-10s – 2 (1992 U.S. Open – 1992 Open Championship)

Results in The Players Championship

CUT = missed the halfway cut
WD = withdrew
"T" indicates a tie for a place

Results in World Golf Championships

QF, R16, R32, R64 = Round in which player lost in match play
"T" = Tied

Results in senior major championships
Results are not in chronological order before 2022.

CUT = missed the halfway cut
WD = withdrew
"T" indicates a tie for a place
NT = No tournament due to COVID-19 pandemic

Team appearances
World Cup (representing Wales): 1980, 1982, 1983, 1984, 1985, 1987 (team and individual winner), 1990, 1991 (individual winner), 1992, 1993, 1994, 1996, 1997, 1998, 2000, 2002, 2003
Hennessy Cognac Cup (representing Great Britain & Ireland): 1982 (winners), (representing Wales) 1984
Ryder Cup (representing Europe): 1983, 1985 (winners), 1987 (winners), 1989 (tied – cup retained), 1991, 1993, 1995 (winners), 1997 (winners), 2006 (winners, non-playing captain)
Alfred Dunhill Cup (representing Wales): 1985, 1986, 1988, 1989, 1990, 1991, 1993, 1995, 2000
Four Tours World Championship (representing Europe): 1985, 1986, 1987, 1989, 1990
Seve Trophy (representing Great Britain & Ireland): 2000, 2002 (winners)
UBS Cup (representing the Rest of the World): 2001, 2002, 2003 (tie), 2004
Royal Trophy (representing Europe): 2006 (winners)

See also

List of golfers with most European Tour wins

References

External links

Llanymynech Golf Club

Welsh male golfers
European Tour golfers
European Senior Tour golfers
PGA Tour Champions golfers
Winners of men's major golf championships
Ryder Cup competitors for Europe
World Golf Hall of Fame inductees
Officers of the Order of the British Empire
Sportspeople from Oswestry
1958 births
Living people